GS2 may be a shorthand reference to:

In technology
Samsung Galaxy S II
Samsung Gear S2

In video games
Galactic Civilizations II
Golden Sun: The Lost Age
Phoenix Wright: Ace Attorney − Justice for All, known in Japan as Gytakuten Saiban 2